John Pointer (1782 in England – 1815 in England) was an English professional cricketer.

Career
He was mainly associated with Hampshire and he made 15 known appearances in first-class matches from 1803 to 1810.

References

External sources
 CricketArchive record

1782 births
1815 deaths
English cricketers
English cricketers of 1787 to 1825
Hampshire cricketers